Love at First Sound (born September 9, 1989) is an American rapper, singer, songwriter, record producer, director, entrepreneur, and fashion designer. Love's rise to prominence began with the visual release of Reckless on May 27, 2014.

Discography

Production discography

Discography

Unreleased production discography
 Mickey Factz, "Serenade"

References

1994 births
Living people